Unsaturated monomers are those having carbon–carbon double bonds.  In general, the term "unsaturated" refers to the presence of one or more double (or triple) bonds and the ability to "saturate" the molecule by addition of H2.

Some examples of unsaturated monomers include: acrylic acid, acrylamide, acryloyl chloride, and methyl methacrylate.
Research suggests that unsaturated monomers that are coordinatively complexed together may be important in the process of enantioselective cyclopropanation of synthetic fibers.

References

Polymer chemistry
Monomers